Belinda Bencic (born 10 March 1997) is a Swiss professional tennis player. She has a career-high ranking of No. 4 by the Women's Tennis Association (WTA) which she achieved in February 2020. Bencic has won eight singles titles, including a gold medal at the 2020 Tokyo Olympics, and two doubles titles on the WTA Tour.

Born in Switzerland to Slovak parents at a time when another Slovak-Swiss player Martina Hingis was one of the best tennis players in the world, Bencic began playing tennis at the age of two. Her father arranged for her to train with Hingis's mother and coach  daily from the age of seven. By the time she was 16, Bencic became the No. 1 ranked junior in the world and won two junior Grand Slam singles titles at the French Open and Wimbledon. On the professional tour, she made her top 100 debut shortly after turning 17. Her first big breakthrough came at the 2014 US Open, where she became the youngest quarterfinalist since Hingis in 1997. Bencic won her first two WTA Tour titles in 2015, including the Canadian Open where she defeated four of the top six players in the world. She then made her top-ten debut the following year while still 18 years old.

From 2016 through 2018, Bencic struggled with a variety of injury issues, most notably needing to have wrist surgery in 2017 that kept her out for five months and saw her drop outside the top 300 in the WTA rankings. Nonetheless, she rebounded quickly and rose back into the top 50 within a year of her comeback. She then posted her best season to date in 2019, winning her second Premier-5 title at the Dubai Championships reaching her first Grand Slam semifinal at the US Open, qualifying for her first WTA Finals where she reached the semifinals, and finishing the year inside the top 10 for the first time, which helped her win the WTA Comeback Player of the Year award.

Early life and background
Bencic was born in Flawil in northeastern Switzerland to Dana and Ivan Benčič. Her parents were both born in Czechoslovakia, but her father's family emigrated to Switzerland in 1968 to escape from the Warsaw Pact invasion by the Soviet Union. Her father was a professional hockey player in the Swiss National League A and National League B before becoming an insurance broker. Her mother was a high-level handball player. Bencic hit her first tennis balls at the age of two and began training with her father, who was also a recreational tennis player, for one hour per day at the age of four. She entered her first national tournament at that age, losing to an opponent six years older in straight sets without winning a game. Bencic would regularly face much older opponents as a child and was encouraged by her father to try to win two games per set.

When Bencic was five years old, her father contacted fellow Czechoslovak immigrant Melanie Molitor, the mother and coach of world No. 1 Swiss tennis player, Martina Hingis, for coaching advice. Hingis becoming the top player in the world around the time Bencic was born was also one reason her father was inspired to introduce her to the sport of tennis. Molitor agreed to gauge Bencic's abilities, which led to Bencic working with Molitor once a week for about a year. At the age of six, Bencic also spent six months at Nick Bollettieri's academy in Florida, winning several under-10 tournaments. Around this time, her father also asked Marcel Niederer, a childhood friend and fellow hockey player who had become an entrepreneur, if he could help sponsor his daughter's career. Niederer agreed to invest in Bencic, which gave her father the ability to quit his job so he could spend more time traveling with and coaching his daughter while she competed at tournaments. In 2004, when Bencic was seven years old, her family moved to Wollerau, where Molitor had just opened up her own academy, so that she could train there every day. She continued to work with Molitor through her teenage years, and has also occasionally worked with Hingis.

Junior career

Bencic is a former world No. 1 junior. She began competing on the ITF Junior Circuit in 2010 at the age of 13, reaching the final in her debut event at the lowest-level Grade 5 Luzern Junior Competition in Switzerland. In early 2012, Bencic won two high-level Grade 1 events at the Czech International Junior Indoor Championships and the Open International Junior de Beaulieu-sur-Mer in France, the first of which coming at 14 years old. She also made her junior Grand Slam debut, playing in all of the major tournaments except the Australian Open. Although she won just two matches in total in singles, she finished runner-up in doubles at both Wimbledon and the US Open. She lost to the American team of Taylor Townsend and Gabrielle Andrews at both events, partnering with Ana Konjuh at the former and Petra Uberalová at the latter. Bencic closed out the year by winning her first Grade A title at the Abierto Juvenil Mexicano, losing just 15 games in six matches.

Bencic did not play again on the junior tour until May 2013, instead opting to focus on professional events. When she returned to the juniors, she won her first five tournaments of the year and extended her win streak in singles to 39 matches. All of her titles were Grade 1 or higher, including three Grade A titles at the Trofeo Bonfiglio and two Grand Slam events, the French Open and Wimbledon. She defeated Antonia Lottner in the French Open final and Townsend in the Wimbledon final. The victory over Townsend was a rematch of their quarterfinal at the French Open, which finished 9–7 in the third and final set. Bencic became the first player to win the girls' singles titles at the French Open and Wimbledon in the same year since Amelie Mauresmo in 1996. She was also the first Swiss girl to win a junior Grand Slam singles title since Martina Hingis in 1994, who won the same two titles that year. Bencic's win streak was ended at the European Junior Championships by Barbora Krejčíková in the semifinals. Lottner then defeated her at the US Open in the quarterfinals in her last tournament of the year. She also had a third Grand Slam runner-up finish in doubles at the US Open, losing to the Czech team of Krejčíková and Kateřina Siniaková alongside Sara Sorribes Tormo. With her success, Bencic became the world No. 1 junior in June and finished the season with the top ranking to earn the title of ITF Junior World Champion.

Professional career

2011–14: Newcomer of the Year, US Open quarterfinal at 17

Bencic entered her first professional tournament on the ITF Women's Circuit in March 2011 in Fällanden, Switzerland, shortly after her 14th birthday. She reached the quarterfinals as a qualifier, recording her first ITF main-draw win over compatriot Tess Sugnaux. Bencic made her WTA Tour qualifying draw debut at the Luxembourg Open towards the end of the year in October, losing in three sets to Yulia Putintseva. She received a wildcard into the main draw at the following year's event, where she lost her WTA Tour main-draw debut to Venus Williams. The tournament came a few weeks after Bencic had won her first two ITF singles titles in back-to-back weeks at Sharm El Sheikh in Egypt, also winning the doubles title in the first week. In 2013, Bencic progressed from $10k to $25k and $50k tier events. Her best results in the first half of the year were a singles semifinal at the $50k Indian Harbour Beach Pro Tennis Classic in the United States and a doubles title at the $25k event in Lenzerheide, Switzerland. Bencic played in three WTA Tour main draws in the second half of the year. After losing at the Swedish Open in July, she won her first career WTA main draw match as a wild card at the Pan Pacific Open against Daria Gavrilova. She also won a match the following week at the Japan Women's Open. In her last event of 2013, Bencic reached the semifinals of the $75k Dunlop World Challenge in Tokyo to break into the top 200 for the first time. She finished the year ranked at No. 184, a vast improvement from her ranking of No. 612 in January.

Despite beginning 2014 well outside of the top 100, Bencic only played in WTA Tour-level events throughout the year. She made her Grand Slam debut at the Australian Open, qualifying for the main draw. She defeated Kimiko Date-Krumm in the first round in a matchup of the oldest and second-youngest players in the draw before losing to the eventual champion Li Na in her next match. Bencic did not win another main-draw match until April when she made it to the semifinals as a qualifier at the Charleston Open in her first clay court event of the year. She defeated four top 100 players at the tournament, including No. 29 Maria Kirilenko and No. 11 Sara Errani. With this result, she also made her top-100 debut less than a month after turning 17. Her clay-court season ended at Roland Garros with another loss to No. 29 Venus Williams. Bencic improved on that result at each of her next two Grand Slam events. After reaching the third round at Wimbledon, she made it to the quarterfinals at the US Open. During the tournament, she recorded the first two top-ten victories of her career over No. 7, Angelique Kerber, and No. 10, Jelena Janković, to become the youngest quarterfinalist at the US Open since Hingis in 1997. Thanks to her success at the Grand Slam tournaments she rose to No. 33 in the world after the event. Bencic closed out the year by reaching her first career WTA tournament final at the Tianjin Open, where she finished runner-up to Alison Riske. At the end of the season, she was named WTA Newcomer of the Year.

2015: Maiden WTA Tour title, Premier 5 title, world No. 12

Bencic struggled in the first half of 2015. Through the French Open at the end of May, she won multiple matches in the same event only twice, reaching the fourth round at both the Indian Wells Open and the Miami Open. At Indian Wells, she notably won a match against No. 5 Caroline Wozniacki, the highest-ranked player she had ever defeated at the time. Bencic lost in the opening round at the Australian Open and the second round at the French Open. She began to turn her year around during the grass-court season. In the lead-up to Wimbledon, she made her second and third career WTA finals. After finishing runner-up to Camila Giorgi at the Rosmalen Championships, she won the Eastbourne International over Agnieszka Radwańska for her maiden WTA title. Bencic then improved on her previous year's result at Wimbledon by reaching the fourth round.

At the Premier-level Canadian Open in August, Bencic produced her best performance of the year to win the title. During her run, she defeated six of the top 25 players in the world, including four of the top six, and her third victory of the year against No. 5, Caroline Wozniacki. In the last two rounds, she recorded her first victory over a current world No. 1 player in Serena Williams, before beating No. 3 Simona Halep in the final; Halep needed to retire in the third set due to heat illness. Serena had entered the tournament with only one loss on the season, having won the first three majors of the year. With the title, Bencic became No. 12 in the world. She ended the summer with a third round loss at the US Open to Venus Williams. Bencic reached another final later that month at the Pan Pacific Open. During the event, she recorded two more top ten victories, including a fourth over Wozniacki, before finishing runner-up to Radwanska in their second final of the year. In early October, Bencic ended her season early due to leg and hand injuries. As a result, she withdrew from the WTA Elite Trophy, the second-tier year-end championship, despite qualifying for the event.

2016–17: Top 10 debut, injury layoffs

Bencic returned to the tour for the Australian hardcourt season. She had a strong start to the year, reaching the semifinals at the Sydney International and losing in the fourth round at the Australian Open to No. 5, Maria Sharapova. At the St. Petersburg Trophy, Bencic was the top seed and finished runner-up to Roberta Vinci. This performance helped her enter the top 10 for the first time while still 18 years old, making her the first teenager in the top 10 of the WTA rankings since Caroline Wozniacki in 2009. After St. Petersburg, Bencic began to struggle. She retired from her second-round match at Miami and was forced to miss nearly the entire clay-court season due to a back injury, including the French Open. Bencic returned for the grass-court season, but could not match her level of success prior to being injured. She recorded multiple wins at just two more events the rest of the year, the Rosmalen Championships where she reached the semifinals and the US Open where she reached the third round. She also had to retire from her second-round match at Wimbledon due to a wrist injury. As a result, Bencic fell to world No. 43 by the end of the season.

Bencic continued to struggle at the beginning of 2017. She recorded just one WTA Tour singles match-win through the first four months of the year. In late April, she underwent surgery on her left wrist that was expected to keep her out for several months. She did not return until September, at which point her ranking had dropped to No. 312 in the world. Bencic was able to rise back into the top 200 in just one week after winning her first comeback tournament, the $100k Neva Cup. She then received a wildcard to play at the Linz Open and made the quarterfinals in her only WTA Tour event before the end of the season. Bencic finished the year by winning three tournaments in a row in Asia. She won two WTA 125 events in back-to-back weeks in November at the Hua Hin Championships and the Taipei Challenger before also winning the $100k Al Habtoor Challenge in Dubai one month later. With these three titles, she moved back into the top 100, ending the year at No. 74 in the world.

2018: Slow ascent back into top 50

Bencic made her return to the Grand Slam tournaments at the Australian Open. After upsetting the previous year's runner-up No. 5 Venus Williams, she was upset by qualifier Luksika Kumkhum in the next round. For the third consecutive year, Bencic was forced to miss a few consecutive months due to injury. A stress fracture in her foot sidelined her from mid-March to late May. Although she missed the rest of the clay-court season, she made her return at the French Open and made it to the second round. She did better at Wimbledon, matching her career-best result of a fourth-round appearance highlighted by a first-round upset of No. 6, Caroline Garcia, and saving four match points in her second-round win against Alison Riske. This performance put her back in the top 50. Later that summer, Bencic lost her opening round match at the US Open. In the last stage of the season, Bencic reached her only WTA final of the year, finishing runner-up to top seed and world No. 9, Julia Görges, at the Luxembourg Open as a qualifier. After the end of the WTA Tour season, she entered several ITF and WTA 125 events to try to defend some of her rankings points from the previous year. Bencic won the $80k title at the Red Rock Pro Open in Las Vegas, but still dropped from inside to No. 54 by the start of 2019.

2019: First Grand Slam semifinal, end of WTA title drought
Despite being back outside of the top 50, Bencic had a strong start to 2019. She reached the semifinals at the Hobart International and made it to the third round at the Australian Open, losing to eventual finalist Petra Kvitová. Her next breakthrough came at the Dubai Tennis Championships. As an unseeded player, she defeated four top-ten players in the last four matches to win her third WTA singles title and second at the Premier 5-level. In order, she recorded wins over No. 9 Aryna Sabalenka, No. 2 Simona Halep, No. 6 Elina Svitolina, and No. 4 Petra Kvitová, all in three sets and two of which in a final set tiebreak. The title helped her rise to world No. 23. Bencic continued her win streak with a semifinal appearance at the Indian Wells Open. She defeated two more top-ten players in No. 1, Naomi Osaka, and No. 5 Karolina Plíšková before losing to No. 8, Angelique Kerber. In the lead-up to the French Open, Bencic produced another Premier Mandatory semifinal at the Madrid Open. She recorded another world-number-one win over Osaka, but could not defeat Halep in a tight three-set match. After the tournament, she moved up to No. 15. At the French Open, she advanced to the third round for the first time, where she was defeated by No. 24 Donna Vekić. During the grass-court season, Bencic made her second WTA final of the year at the Mallorca Open. After defeating top seed and world No. 6 Kerber, she finished runner-up to Sofia Kenin, after having three match points in the second set. Like at the Australian Open and the French Open, she lost in the third round at Wimbledon.

Bencic only played the two Premier 5 tournaments in the lead-up to the US Open, with her best result a third-round appearance at the Canadian Open. At the US Open, Bencic produced the best Grand Slam result of her career to date. In the fourth round, she defeated defending champion and world No. 1 Osaka for the third time this season. She went on to make the semifinals, where she lost to eventual champion Bianca Andreescu. This result put her back in the top 10 for the first time since June 2016. Bencic then finished the season strong by winning her second title of the year at the Kremlin Cup as a wildcard. She defeated hometown favourite Anastasia Pavlyuchenkova in the final, which helped her jump ahead of Kiki Bertens and Serena Williams to qualify for the WTA Finals for the first time. At the year-end championships, Bencic was grouped with Ashleigh Barty, Petra Kvitová, and Naomi Osaka, the latter of whom was replaced by Bertens after one match. After losing her opening match to Barty, Bencic defeated Kvitová and Bertens to advance to the knockout rounds. Her season came to an end with a semifinal loss to Elina Svitolina. She finished the year at No. 8 in the world. At the end of the season, Bencic won the WTA Comeback Player of the Year for her return to the top 10.

2020–21: Top 5 debut, two WTA 500 finals, Olympic champion in singles, Olympic silver in doubles
In February 2021, she reached the final of the WTA 500 Adelaide International event. At the German Open, Bencic reached her second final in the season but lost, after a stunning comeback from the qualifier Liudmila Samsonova. She had not won a title on the WTA 500-level in two years since she won the title in Moscow in 2019.

At the 2020 Tokyo Olympics, Bencic beat Jessica Pegula, Misaki Doi, French Open champion Barbora Krejčíková and Anastasia Pavlyuchenkova to reach the semifinals. A three-set victory over Elena Rybakina guaranteed Bencic a medal. She defeated Markéta Vondroušová in the final, to become the first Swiss woman to win the gold medal in singles. Bencic also won silver in the women’s doubles, teaming up with Viktorija Golubic.

Bencic reached the quarterfinals of the US Open. Seeded 11th, Bencic beat Arantxa Rus, Martina Trevisan, Jessica Pegula, and Iga Świątek without dropping a set, before losing in straight sets to eventual champion Emma Raducanu.

2022: Miami semifinal, First WTA title on clay, win over Serena Williams
Bencic started her season at Sydney, she defeated Beatriz Haddad Maia, Océane Dodin to reach the quarterfinals. Then she lost to eventual champion Paula Badosa.

At the Australian Open, Bencic lost to Amanda Anisimova in the second round.

In St. Petersburg, she defeated Veronika Kudermetova, Kaja Juvan before she lost to eventual champion Anett Kontaveit in the quarterfinals. At Doha, she lost to Clara Tauson in the first round.

Bencic entered the Indian Wells Open, and as the 22nd seed received a bye in first round, but then lost to Kaia Kanepi in second. She played in Miami seeded 22nd again, where she defeated Marta Kostyuk, Heather Watson, and Aliaksandra Sasnovich to reach her first Miami quarterfinal. Then she beat Daria Saville to made her first ever Miami semifinal. In the semifinal, she lost to Naomi Osaka.

Bencic entered the Charleston open as tenth seed and defeated Wang Xiyu, Linda Fruhvirtová and Madison Keys to reach the quarterfinals. Then she beat world No. 3, Paula Badosa, for the first time in four meetings to make the semifinals. In the semifinals, she defeated Ekaterina Alexandrova to reach her first WTA clay court final. Then she defeated fourth seed Ons Jabeur to win her first ever WTA clay-court title and sixth overall. However, Bencic lost to Ons Jabeur in the round of 16 at her next event, the Madrid Open. At the French Open, she lost in the third round to Leylah Fernandez, in three sets, at her first meeting between them.

Bencic entered the German Open as eighth seed. She made it to the final losing to top seed Ons Jabeur; en-route to the final she defeated a few top players like Veronika Kudermetova and Maria Sakkari. 

At Wimbledon, she lost in the first round to Wang Qiang.

At the WTA 1000 in Canada she defeated qualifier Tereza Martincová, Serena Williams, who was playing under a protected ranking, and Garbiñe Muguruza to reach the quarterfinals.

2023: Two titles and return to top 10
In Adelaide, she reached the final by defeating Garbiñe Muguruza, Anna Kalinskaya, world No. 4 Caroline Garcia, and Veronika Kudermetova, who withdrew from the semifinals. Then she beat 5th seed Daria Kasatkina in a lopsided match to win her seventh WTA title. As a result, she returned to the top 10 for the first time since 28 September 2020.

At the Australian Open, she defeated Viktoriya Tomova, Claire Liu and Camila Giorgi to reached the round of 16 where she lost to eventual champion Aryna Sabalenka.

Then she entered Abu Dhabi as the second seed, and defeated Marta Kostyuk, qualifier Shelby Rogers & Beatriz Haddad Maia to make her seventeenth final overall and second of the season. She defeated Liudmila Samsonova in the final to win her eighth title, after saving three match points.

National representation

Fed Cup
Bencic made her debut for the Switzerland Fed Cup team in 2012 at the age of 14. That year, she played in two doubles dead rubbers with Amra Sadikovic, losing to the Australian pair of Casey Dellacqua and Jelena Dokic and defeating the Belarusian pair of Aliaksandra Sasnovich and Darya Lebesheva. She played in her first live rubbers in 2014 when Switzerland were World Group II. Although Bencic won both of her singles matches against France over Alizé Cornet and Virginie Razzano, her compatriots Timea Bacsinszky and Stefanie Vögele lost their matches to set up a decisive doubles rubber. Bencic and Bacsinszky lost the match and the tie to Cornet and Kristina Mladenovic. In the World Group II play-off round two months later, Bencic and Bacsinszky led Switzerland to a 4–1 win over Brazil, with Bencic winning one of her two singles matches. The following year, the duo swept their first three singles matches against Sweden to advance to the World Group Play-offs. Although Bencic missed the play-off due to injury, Switzerland defeated Poland to return to the top-tier World Group the following year.

In the World Group, Switzerland made it to the semifinals in both 2016 and 2017. Bencic led the team to their 2016 first round over Germany, winning both of her singles matches against Andrea Petkovic and Angelique Kerber as well as the decisive doubles rubber with Martina Hingis. She was injured for the next tie, a loss to the Czech Republic. The following year, Bencic split her two singles matches as Switzerland advanced 4–1 past France. She was named to the team for the semifinal round against Belarus, but did not play in any of the live rubbers as she was dealing with a wrist injury at the time. In 2018, Switzerland were again eliminated by the Czech Republic, this time in the first round as Bencic lost both of her singles matches. She was unavailable for the play-off round due to injury, which Switzerland lost to Romania to fall out of the World Group. The next year, Bencic led her team to a victory over Italy in World Group II with two singles wins. However, she was unavailable as Switzerland lost their play-off tie to the United States to keep them in World Group II.

In 2022, team Switzerland won the Billie Jean King Cup for the first time in history. Bencic was among three other nominated players - Teichmann, Golubic and Waltert. On their way to the play-off, they beat Canada and Italy in Group A with losing an only match to Canada. In the semifinal, the Swiss team won against Czech Republic by winning both singles matches and advanced to the final. Once again, it was enough to win both singles matches against Australia and so they became the 2022 champions.

Hopman Cup
Bencic has competed at the Hopman Cup in January with Roger Federer for three consecutive years from 2017 through 2019. After finishing in second place in their round robin group to the eventual champions France in 2017, the pair won the tournament in each of the next two years. In 2018, they won all nine of their round robin rubbers to set up a final against the German team of Angelique Kerber and Alexander Zverev. After Federer defeated Zverev and Bencic lost to Kerber, the Swiss team won the decisive mixed doubles rubber in straight sets for the title. During the 2019 event, they were upset by the Greek team of Maria Sakkari and Stefanos Tsitsipas in their last round robin tie, but still advanced to the final through the tiebreak criteria. In a rematch of the previous year's final, Federer again beat Zverev while Kerber again defeated Bencic. The mixed doubles rubber was much closer than in 2018 and came down to a winner-take-all point in the third-set tiebreak as part of the Fast4 format. Federer served the point, which Switzerland won in a long rally to win their second consecutive Hopman Cup.

Olympics
Seeded No. 9, she also represented her country in her first Olympic Games at Tokyo, after having to skip Rio 2016 due to injury, where she defeated Roland Garros champion and eighth seed Barbora Krejcikova in the third round of the competition and the Roland Garros finalist and 13th seed Russian Anastasia Pavlyuchenkova in the quarterfinals. She reached the final defeating 15th seed Kazakh Elena Rybakina in the semifinals booking Switzerland the first Olympic female singles final.

She also advanced to the doubles final with Viktorija Golubic, which she eventually won the Olympic silver medal in. Bencic became the fifth player to reach two finals at the same Olympic event since tennis returned at the Games in 1988, joining Serena and Venus Williams, Andy Murray and Nicolas Massu.

Playing style

Bencic has an all-court game, who possesses an aggressive playing style. She is regularly compared to former world No. 1 Martina Hingis, as both players are Swiss, of Slovak descent, and have been coached by Hingis's mother. Hingis has compared herself with Bencic, saying, "The technique, my mom puts a lot of attention to that. So the game, I mean, [Bencic has] got a great backhand as well. But also she’s stronger, so she can work with other weapons than I had. I mean, maybe I was more maybe a little better mover, but when she hits a shot it can be a winner. Like she’s hitting a lot more winners than did I. So it’s different a little bit." Tennis coach Günter Bresnik has called her an "unbelievably smart player” and noted that, “She understands the game really well and knows exactly how to throw the other player off." Bencic possesses a powerful first serve, peaking at 113 mph (182 km/h), allowing her to serve aces and dictate play from the first stroke of a point. Despite this, Bencic's second serve is a considerable weakness, and is heavily affected by nerves, meaning that she typically serves a large number of double faults. Bencic possesses the ability to hit powerful groundstroke winners, but she can also hit lob and drop shot winners when presented with the opportunity. When playing with Roger Federer at the Hopman Cup, he praised her prowess at returning serve. Bencic excels at hitting the ball early or on the rise, and is capable of turning defense into offense, excelling at redirecting cross-court shots down the line. Bencic is an accomplished opponent on all surfaces, although she has stated that her favourite surface is grass.

Coaches
As a junior, Bencic was coached by her father and Melanie Molitor, the mother of Martina Hingis. Molitor coached Bencic daily from 2004 to 2012, at which point her father Ivan again became her primary coach. In late 2017, she hired Iain Hughes during her recovery from wrist surgery. Vladimír Pláteník worked with Bencic in 2018 from Wimbledon in July until mid-October, at which point her father returned as her main coach. In their first tournament back together, Bencic reached the final at the Luxembourg Open. Bencic is currently coached by Russian tennis player Dmitry Tursunov.

Endorsements
Bencic has been endorsed by Yonex for racquets since turning professional, and was endorsed by Adidas for clothing and footwear from 2011. In 2015, Bencic signed a 'top-to-toe' endorsement deal with Yonex, being supplied with clothing and footwear by the company, along with her racquets. In 2018, upon her return to professional tennis after a long injury layoff, Bencic became endorsed by Nike for clothing and footwear. Bencic has used the Yonex EZONE 100 racquet throughout her professional career.

Personal life
Bencic has a brother named Brian who is three years younger and also plays tennis. He trained with her at Molitor's academy and was ranked as a top 200 junior in the world.
She has both Swiss and Slovak citizenship.

Career statistics

Grand Slam tournament performance timelines

Singles

Doubles

Olympic Games

Singles: 1 (gold medal)

Doubles: 1 (silver medal)

References

External links

 
 
 
 
 
 
 

1997 births
Living people
Sportspeople from the canton of St. Gallen
Swiss expatriate sportspeople in the United States
Swiss female tennis players
Swiss people of Slovak descent
French Open junior champions
Wimbledon junior champions
Grand Slam (tennis) champions in girls' singles
Hopman Cup competitors
Tennis players at the 2020 Summer Olympics
Olympic gold medalists for Switzerland
Olympic silver medalists for Switzerland
Olympic tennis players of Switzerland
Olympic medalists in tennis
Medalists at the 2020 Summer Olympics